The 1979 NCAA Division II basketball tournament involved 32 schools playing in a single-elimination tournament to determine the national champion of men's NCAA Division II college basketball as a culmination of the 1978–79 NCAA Division II men's basketball season. It was won by the University of North Alabama and North Alabama's Perry Oden was the Most Outstanding Player.

Regional participants

*denotes tie

Regionals

Great Lakes - Fairborn, Ohio
Location: Physical Education Building Host: Wright State University

Third Place - Eastern Illinois 65, Northern Michigan 58

New England - Waltham, Massachusetts
Location: Dana Center Host: Bentley College

Third Place - Bentley 104, Quinnipiac 93

South Central - Kirksville, Missouri
Location: Pershing Arena Host: Northeast Missouri State University

Third Place - SE Missouri State 86, NE Missouri State 82

South - Lakeland, Florida
Location: Jenkins Fieldhouse Host: Florida Southern College

Third Place - Tuskegee 107, Florida Southern 102

West - Tacoma, Washington
Location: Memorial Fieldhouse Host: University of Puget Sound

Third Place - San Diego 74, Cal State Northridge 69*

Central - Omaha, Nebraska
Location: UNO Fieldhouse Host: University of Nebraska at Omaha

Third Place - Nebraska-Omaha 86, North Dakota 75

East - Oneonta, New York
Location: Binder Physical Education Center Host: Hartwick College

Third Place - Albany State 72, Philadelphia U 61

South Atlantic - Catonsville, Maryland
Location: UMBC Fieldhouse Host: University of Maryland, Baltimore County

Third Place - Mount St. Mary's 93, Roanoke 89

*denotes each overtime played

National Quarterfinals

National Finals - Springfield, Missouri
Location: Hammons Center Host: Southwest Missouri State University

Third Place - Cheyney 81, Bridgeport 78

*denotes each overtime played

All-tournament team
 Ron Darby (North Alabama)
 Carlton Hurdle (Bridgeport)
 Rory Lindgren (Wisconsin-Green Bay)
 Perry Oden (North Alabama)
 Ron Ripley (Wisconsin-Green Bay)

See also
1979 NCAA Division I basketball tournament
1979 NCAA Division III basketball tournament
1979 NAIA Basketball Tournament

References

Sources
 2010 NCAA Men's Basketball Championship Tournament Records and Statistics: Division II men's basketball Championship
 1979 NCAA Division II men's basketball tournament jonfmorse.com

NCAA Division II men's basketball tournament
Tournament
NCAA Division II basketball tournament
NCAA Division II basketball tournament